Burning Kingdom is the second EP by Bill Callahan (also known as Smog), released on Drag City in 1994 and later re-released in Europe on Domino. "My Shell" is an electric version of the 1991 single of the same name.

This EP is the first of two collaborations between Callahan and the drummer Ron Burns, as well as the beginning of his work with Cynthia Dall. She provided vocals to "Renée Died 1:45". Steven Zdybel played violin and Kim Osterwalder played cello, as she did on the Julius Caesar album.

Track listing
All tracks written by Bill Callahan except where noted.

 "My Shell" (Electric Version) – 5:47
 "Renée Died 1:45" (Callahan, Dall) – 1:50
 "My Family" – 3:33
 "Drunk on the Stars" – 4:18
 "Not Lonely Anymore" – 2:03
 "The Desert" – 2:59

Personnel
 Bill Callahan – vocals, guitar
 Cynthia Dall – vocals
 Ron Burns – drums
 Kim Osterwalder – cello

References

1994 EPs
Bill Callahan (musician) EPs
Drag City (record label) EPs
Domino Recording Company EPs